Malus transitoria, the cut-leaf crabapple, is a species of flowering plant in the crabapple genus Malus of the family Rosaceae, native to China.

The Latin transitoria means "short-lived". The name "cut-leaf" refers to the shape of the leaves.

Description

The deeply divided leaves turn yellow in autumn.

It produces abundant white flowers, and small yellow fruits 8 mm in diameter.

Varieties
Varieties include:
Malus transitoria var. centralasiatica
Malus transitoria var. glabrescens
Malus transitoria var. transitoria

Uses
Malus transitoria is cultivated as an ornamental tree, for its elegant shape, abundant white blossoms, and yellow fruits. It has gained the Royal Horticultural Society's Award of Garden Merit. 

It is also used as rootstock for other apples.

References

transitoria
Crabapples
Endemic flora of China
Garden plants of Asia
Ornamental trees